The 1893 Washington & Jefferson football team was an American football team that represented Washington & Jefferson College as an independent during the 1893 college football season. Led by Joseph Hamilton in his first and only year as head coach, the team compiled a record of 5–3.

Schedule

References

Washington and Jefferson
Washington & Jefferson Presidents football seasons
Washington and Jefferson football